Nebrioporus depressus is a species of predaceous diving beetle in the family Dytiscidae. It is found in Europe and Northern Asia (excluding China) and North America.

References

Further reading

External links

Dytiscidae
Articles created by Qbugbot
Beetles described in 1775
Taxa named by Johan Christian Fabricius